On September 2, 2008, 28-year-old Isaac Zamora killed six people (including one sheriff's deputy) and wounded two more on a shooting rampage in Skagit County, Washington. The incident began when Skagit County Sheriff's Deputy Anne Jackson responded to a call at Zamora's home in Alger, Washington. Zamora shot Jackson and then left the residence. He shot seven additional people and led authorities on a high-speed chase along Interstate 5 before surrendering at the Skagit County Sheriff's Office in Mount Vernon, Washington.

At his 2009 trial, Zamora pled guilty to several felony charges, including four counts of aggravated murder, in the shootings, and not guilty by reason of insanity to two additional counts of aggravated murder. Zamora received four life sentences and was subsequently committed to Western State Hospital. In 2012, Zamora was moved to the Monroe Correctional Complex due to concerns that his presence posed a threat to hospital staff and other patients. In 2019 Zamora is appealing for a new trial.

Victims 
Chester Rose, aged 58
Anne Jackson, aged 40
Julie Binschus, aged 48
David Radcliffe, aged 57
Greg Gillum, aged 38
Leroy Lange, aged 64

See also
 List of rampage killers in the United States

References

2008 murders in the United States
Murder in Washington (state)
Deaths by firearm in Washington (state)
Spree shootings in the United States
September 2008 crimes
History of Skagit County, Washington